Martin Dziewialtowski (born 23 December 1972) is a Scottish former professional snooker player.

Career

Born in 1972, Dziewialtowski turned professional in 1992, in a time where the tour was a largely open affair with over 700 players allowed to compete professionally. He first made any progress at a ranking event in 1995 at that year's Thailand Classic, where he lost 1–5 to Brian Morgan in the last 48.

The 1997/1998 season was a breakthrough for Dziewialtowski; in danger of losing his place on the tour, he reached the quarter-final of the 1997 UK Championship, defeating Anthony Davies, Joe Swail, Quinten Hann and Dean Reynolds before losing 1–9 to Matthew Stevens. Later that season, he also reached the last 32 of the 1998 Welsh Open, where he lost 1–5 to compatriot Alan McManus.

Little success ensued, until the 2000 Welsh Open, where Dziewialtowski was defeated 5–3 by Paul Hunter in the last 32; his performance in that year's Thailand Masters produced exactly the same result.

Although Dziewialtowski reached his highest ranking, 68th, for the 2001/2002 season, he did not reach the main stages of another ranking tournament before dropping from the professional tour in 2004, aged 31. By this time, the tour had largely changed since he became professional in the early 1990s, as only around 100 players were classed as professionals.

Dziewialtowski attempted to re-qualify at two Challenge Tour events in the 2004/2005 season, losing his second match on both occasions. This not being enough to turn professional again, his 2005 World Championship first-round qualifying match, which he lost 1–5 to Jeff Cundy, was Dziewialtowski's last at competitive level.

References

1972 births
Living people
Scottish snooker players